Duds is a 1920 American silent mystery film directed by Thomas R. Mills, and starring Tom Moore, Naomi Childers, Christine Mayo, Edwin Stevens, Lionel Belmore, and Edwin Wallock. It is based on the Saturday Evening Post story of the same name by Henry C. Rowland, which became a novel shortly before the film was released. The film was released by Goldwyn Pictures on February 22, 1920.

Cast
Tom Moore as Phoebe Plunkett
Naomi Childers as Olga Karakoff
Christine Mayo as Patricia Melton
Edwin Stevens as Karakoff
Lionel Belmore as Rosenthal
Edwin Wallock as Durand
Clarence Wilson as Jues
Milton Ross as Slater (as H. Milton Ross)
Betty Lindley as Helen Crosby
Florence Deshon as Marquise
Jack Richardson as Pat's Pal

Preservation
Duds is now considered to be a lost film.

References

External links

1920 mystery films
American mystery films
1920 films
American silent feature films
American black-and-white films
Lost American films
Goldwyn Pictures films
Films based on short fiction
1920 lost films
1920s American films
Silent mystery films
Lost mystery films
1920s English-language films